Benjamin Randall (1749–1808) was the founder of Freewill Baptist Connexion in the United States.

Benjamin Randall may also refer to:

 Benjamin Randall (Maine politician) (1789–1859), American congressman from the state of Maine
 Benjamin Randall (Wisconsin politician) (1793–1863), American politician from the state of Wisconsin
 Benjamin H. Randall (1823–1913), American politician from the state of Minnesota